The 2023 New England Revolution II season is the fourth season in the soccer team's history, where they compete in the third division of American soccer, MLS Next Pro. New England Revolution II, as a child club of New England Revolution of Major League Soccer, are barred from participating in the 2023 U.S. Open Cup. New England Revolution II play their home games at Gillette Stadium, located in Foxborough, Massachusetts, United States.

Club

Roster 
Roster Update: Dec 9, 2022:
As of March 20, 2023.

+ On loan from first team

Academy Roster

Coaching staff

Competitions

Exhibitions

MLS NEXT Pro

Standings 
Eastern Conference

Overall table

Results summary

Results by round

Match results

Statistics

Top scorers

See also 
 2023 New England Revolution season

References

External links 

New England Revolution II
New England Revolution II
New England Revolution II
New England Revolution II